Wan Ahmad Amirzafran bin Wan Nadris @ Wan Nazli (born 20 December 1994) is a Malaysian professional footballer who plays for Malaysia Super League club Sri Pahang as a centre-back.

Career statistics

Club

Honours

Club
KL City FC
 Malaysia Cup: 2021

Terengganu
 Malaysia Cup runner-up: 2018

References

External links 
 

1993 births
Living people
People from Terengganu
Terengganu FC players
Terengganu F.C. II players
Kuala Lumpur City F.C. players
Malaysia Super League players
Malaysia Premier League players
Malaysian footballers
Association football defenders